John Devereux may refer to:

John Devereux, Lord of Munsley (c. 1253–1316), Anglo-Norman nobleman in the time of Edward I and Edward II of England
John Devereux, 1st Baron Devereux (died 1393), peer in the reign of King Richard II of England
John Devereux (died 1419), MP for Dorset
John Devereux, 9th Baron Ferrers of Chartley (c. 1461–1501), English peer
John C. Devereux (1774–1848), mayor of Utica, New York and noted Roman Catholic
 (1778–1860), Irish recruiter of troops for Simón Bolívar, Latin American diplomat, and confidence trickster
John Devereux (politician) (born 1946), Australian politician
John Patrick Devereux (born 1963), American soccer player
John Devereux (rugby) (born 1966), Welsh rugby league and rugby union footballer and coach
John Thomas Devereux (died 1885), member of the UK parliament for Wexford Borough, 1847–1859
John Devereux (academic) (born 1965), Australian professor of law
John Devereux (bishop), 16th-century religious leader in Ireland
John Henry Devereux (1840–1920), American architect and builder

See also
John Devereux Ward (1925–2010), British Conservative Party politician